Bohri is a ghost town in Buffalo County, Wisconsin, United States.

References 

Geography of Buffalo County, Wisconsin
Ghost towns in Wisconsin